The Cheras Christian Cemetery is the largest Christian Cemetery in Malaysia. The cemetery is located in Cheras, Kuala Lumpur and was opened in 1900. The cemetery has a capacity of 22,000 burial plots, all of which were full by January 2012.

The Cheras War Cemetery is located nearby.

Notable burials
 Samantha Schubert – Miss Malaysia World 1991

Issues
Insufficient burial space
As of 2015, the 22,500 burial plots have been taken up  due to high demands from the community and the allocated space by the management failed to meet all the burial requests.

Records management problem
Cases was reported in 2012, whereby a family which had bought their plots next to their father's grave, was shocked to discover a newly-laid tombstone on their plots.  Similarly in 2017, burial plots – bought and paid in 1954, were found to be occupied by new graves.

References

External links
 CWGC: Cheras Road Christian Cemetery
 
 

Cemeteries in Kuala Lumpur
Anglican cemeteries in Asia
Commonwealth War Graves Commission cemeteries in Malaysia